Gunfire at Indian Gap is a 1957 American Western film directed by Joseph Kane and starring Vera Ralston, Anthony George and George Macready.

The film's sets were designed by the art director Ralph Oberg.

Plot

Cast
 Vera Ralston as Cheel Palmer  
 Anthony George as Juan Morales  
 George Macready as Mr. Jefferson  
 Barry Kelley as Sheriff Daniel Harris  
 John Doucette as Loder  
 George Keymas as Scully  
 Chubby Johnson as Samuel  
 Glenn Strange as Matt  
 Dan White as Fred Moran  
 Steve Warren as Ed Stewart  
 Chuck Hicks as Deputy  
 Sarah Selby as Bessie Moran  
 Joe Yrigoyen as Bill

See also
 List of American films of 1957

References

Bibliography
 Pitts, Michael R. Western Movies: A Guide to 5,105 Feature Films. McFarland, 2012.

External links
 

1957 films
1957 Western (genre) films
American Western (genre) films
Films directed by Joseph Kane
Republic Pictures films
1950s English-language films
1950s American films